John Thomas Hay (born September 19, 1954, in Alexandria, Ontario) is a former placekicker for the Ottawa Rough Riders in 1978 and the Calgary Stampeders from 1979 to 1988 in the Canadian Football League.

References

External links
 Official website

1954 births
Ottawa Rough Riders players
Calgary Stampeders players
Canadian football placekickers
Living people
Players of Canadian football from Ontario